Tart cards are cards advertising the services of prostitutes. They are found in many countries, usually in capital cities or red-light districts. Originating in the 1960s, the cards are placed in locations such as newsagents' windows or telephone boxes. Alternatively they are handed out or dropped in the street. Legal action is sometimes taken against their use. Illustrated tart cards from the 1980s and 1990s have come to be regarded as examples of sub-cultural accidental art.

History
The cards originated in the 1960s in places such as Soho, London, as handwritten postcards outside prostitutes' flats or in the windows of newsagents or shops. As direct references to prostitution would generally be unacceptable, the cards were carefully worded and often contained euphemistic references to sex, with terms such as large chest for sale.

By the late 1980s tart cards had become black-and-white photocopied cards containing printed text and telephone numbers. The cards from the 1980s and 1990s often included black-and-white drawings printed on neon-coloured card along with tongue-in-cheek phrases. In larger cities, the cards were placed in phone boxes. The style of illustration changed in the early twenty-first century, when tart cards began to appear with full-colour nude photographs, mobile telephone numbers and websites.

The cards from the 1980s and 1990s have become a memorable part of London counter-culture from that era. Over time they have become regarded as items of "accidental art" and developed a cult following. They have influenced the work of mainstream artists, inspiring collections, research, exhibitions and books such as the 2003 publication Tart Cards: London’s Illicit Advertising Art.

Tart cards by country 

 Argentina: They are found in Buenos Aires.
 Brazil: They are found in São Paulo.
 Dubai: Cards advertising "massage" services, often printed with images of scantily-clad young East Asian women, were slipped under front doors or car windows. This practice has since been made illegal.
 China: They are commonly put under the doors of hotels during the day after the cleaning staff have finished in the rooms.
 Macau: They are dropped in the city's sidewalks and underpasses.
 United Kingdom: in London tart cards are placed in phone boxes by professional "carders", who tour the phone boxes, replacing cards which have been removed by the telephone companies' cleaners. Carders often remove cards placed by rival carders. Placing tart cards in phone boxes was made illegal by the passing of the Criminal Justice and Police Act 2001 which made carding punishable by up to six months imprisonment or a fine of up to £5000. By 2002 most convicted carders were receiving fines of £200–£1000, although persistent offenders were receiving jail terms of 28 days. An estimated 13 million tart cards per year were being distributed across Britain at that time; the telephone company British Telecom was removing 150,000 tart cards per week from central London telephone boxes and it had call-barred 500 of the telephone numbers used on tart cards. However, despite police operations against carders the practice of carding still continues.
 United States: In hispanophone parts of New York City they are known as "Chica Chica" (Girl Girl) cards and men hand them out as flyers at night on the streets. In Las Vegas they are known as "sex cards" and left on sidewalks and hotel stairways or handed out as flyers.

References

Bibliography

External links 

 Pictures of the inside of a phone box covered in tart cards
 Pages from The X-Directory
 Tart Art: the prostitute calling cards of London 

Prostitution in the United Kingdom
Advertising tools